Konstantin "Koča" Popović (14 March 1908 – 20 October 1992) was a Yugoslav politician and communist volunteer in the Spanish Civil War, 1937–1939 and Divisional Commander of the First Proletarian Division of the Yugoslav Partisans. He is on occasion referred to as "the man who saved the Yugoslav Partisans", because it was he who anticipated the weakest point in the Axis lines on the Zelengora–Kalinovik axis, and devised the plan for breaking through it during the Battle of Sutjeska, thus saving Tito, his headquarters and the rest of the resistance movement. After the war, he served as the Chief of the General Staff of the Yugoslav People's Army, before moving to the position of Foreign Minister and spent the final years of his political career as the Vice President of Yugoslavia.

Despite being a member of the Communist Party of Yugoslavia, he was a supporter of free-market reforms and was also a member of a group of Serbian liberals, a prominent political movement in the 1970s, which also included Marko Nikezić and Latinka Perović. He retired in 1972, amidst pressure against his group of liberals. He spent the rest of his life in Dubrovnik and was very outspoken against the Yugoslav Wars and the regimes of Franjo Tuđman and Slobodan Milošević.

In his youth, he was one of the founding members of the Serbian Surrealist movement. He co-wrote a book with Marko Ristić. Also, Popović was among the founders of FK Partizan Belgrade, the football section of the Yugoslav Sports Association Partizan.

Biography
Popović came from a prosperous Belgrade family and spent the First World War in Switzerland. He was also one of the thirteen signatories of the Serbian Surrealist manifesto in 1930.

In 1929, he moved to Paris to study Law and Philosophy. Here he mixed with the Left Bank world of poets, writers, artists and intellectuals. He became an active Surrealist, active in both the French and Serbian Surrealist groups.
In 1931 Nacrt za jednu fenomenologiju iracionalnog (Outline for a Phenomenology of the Irrational) was published which he had co-written with Marko Ristić.

He then became involved with the then illegal Yugoslav Communist Party. In Paris there was a center run by Comintern and headed by Tito which was used to feed volunteers from the Balkans to the Republicans in the Spanish Civil War. Popović was drafted through this center along with a select group of Party members. Popović fought with Spanish Republican forces and not the International Brigades, holding the rank of artillery captain. At the close of the Spanish Civil War Popović escaped through France and made his way back to Yugoslavia.

World War II

In 1940, as a reserve officer in the Royal Yugoslav Army, he was mobilized and told by his Colonel to watch out for subversive activities within the regiment.

After the surrender of the Royal Yugoslav Army to the German Army in April 1941, Popović organized the Kosmaj detachment during the rising in Serbia. On the formation of the First Proletarian Brigade, Popović became its commander, and subsequently commanded the First Proletarian Division.

During his time leading the Partisans he encountered William Deakin, leader of the British military mission to Tito's headquarters, who wrote of Popović:

Post-war
Alongside dozens of others WW2 and Spanish Civil War veterans, Popović was among founding fathers of Partizan Belgrade football club in October 1945.

After the establishment of a communist regime in Yugoslavia in 1945, he served as the Chief of the Yugoslavian General Staff from 1945-1953. In this function he also conducted negotiations with the representatives of Western powers associated with the modernisation of the JNA during the conflict with the Soviet Union (i.e., Informbiro).

Consequently, he became the foreign minister of Yugoslavia in 1953 and held this office until 1965. As the Foreign Minister, he was the head of the Yugoslav delegation to the UN General Assembly sessions on several occasions.

From 1965 until 1972 he acted as a Member of the Federal Executive Council and the Vice-President of Yugoslavia from 1966 until 1967. In 1985 he and Peko Dapčević were considered for promotion in rank General of the Army, but they both rejected the proposition.

He died in 1992 at the age of 84.

Honours

See also 
 Socialist Federal Republic of Yugoslavia
 Yugoslav People's Army
 Yugoslav Partisans
 Titoism
 Josip Broz Tito

References

External links

 Ministry of Foreign Affairs

1908 births
1992 deaths
Politicians from Belgrade
People from the Kingdom of Serbia
Vice presidents of Yugoslavia
League of Communists of Serbia politicians
International Brigades personnel
Yugoslav people of the Spanish Civil War
Serbian people of World War II
Yugoslav Partisans members
Chiefs of Staff of the Yugoslav People's Army
Recipients of the Order of the People's Hero
Government ministers of Yugoslavia
University of Belgrade Faculty of Law alumni
Generals of the Yugoslav People's Army
Serbian male poets
Serbian surrealist writers
Recipients of the Order of the Union of Myanmar
Knights Grand Cross of the Order of the Falcon
Grand Crosses of the Order of George I
20th-century Serbian poets
Foreign ministers of Yugoslavia
Burials at Belgrade New Cemetery
Military personnel from Belgrade
Recipients of the Order of the Hero of Socialist Labour
Recipients of orders, decorations, and medals of Ethiopia
Recipients of orders, decorations, and medals of Sudan